The Vanguard for the Protection of Muslims in Black Africa, better known as Ansaru and less commonly called al-Qaeda in the Lands Beyond the Sahel, is an Islamic fundamentalist Jihadist militant organisation based in the northeast of Nigeria. It originated as a faction of Boko Haram, but became officially independent in 2012. Despite this, Ansaru and other Boko Haram factions continued to work closely together until the former increasingly declined, and stopped its insurgent activities in 2015. Since then, Ansaru is mostly dormant though its members continue to spread propaganda for their cause.

Ideology 
Unlike Boko Haram, whose ideology is focused on Nigeria, Ansaru is more internationally orientated. Its beliefs are closely aligned to those of al-Qaeda. Furthermore, the group has vowed to restore the "dignity of Muslims in black Africa" by reviving the Sokoto Caliphate. The group was also critical of Boko Haram's indiscriminate killing of civilians, with Ansaru commander Khalid Barnawi claiming that his followers would not kill innocent non-Muslims or security officials, except in "self-defense" and that the group would defend the interests of Islam and Muslims not just in Nigeria but the whole of Africa.

Ansaru's motto is "Jihad Fi Sabilillah", meaning "struggle for the cause of Allah".

On 2 January 2022, it was reported by FDD's Long War Journal that Ansaru had reaffirmed its allegiance to al-Qaeda.

History

Foundation 

Ansaru's exact origin is unclear, but it is known that the group emerged as a faction of Boko Haram, an extremist Islamist movement that launched an uprising against the Nigerian government in 2009. The initial rebellion failed, whereupon parts of the movement fled to Algeria and Somalia, where they found shelter among al-Qaeda-linked organizations like AQIM and al-Shabaab. Led by Khalid Barnawi (nom de guerre: "Abu Usamatal Ansari") and Abubakar Adam Kambar ("Abu Yasir"), two close associates of Boko Haram founder Mohammed Yusuf, these exiles became known as "Sahara Men", or "Yan Sahara" in Hausa. They forged close bonds with the al-Qaeda affiliates and trained with them, adopting their ideology and tactics. As result of these experiences, the "Sahara Men" became more sophisticated than the Boko Haram groups which had remained in Nigeria, and eventually came to criticize the latter's way to wage an insurgency.

Having returned to Nigeria, Khalid Barnawi and Abubakar Adam Kambar disagreed with other Boko Haram commanders over the indiscriminate killing of civilians, urging a more concentrated effort against Western and high-profile targets. As result of these disagreements, Ansaru officially split from Boko Haram in January 2012. Khalid Barnawi denounced Boko Haram's actions as "inhuman to the Muslim Ummah". Ansaru became al-Qaeda's de facto branch in Nigeria, and even occasionally called itself "al-Qaeda in the Lands Beyond the Sahel". Ansaru elected Abubakar Adam Kambar as its first commander, but he was killed in August 2012, whereupon Khalid Barnawi became the group's leader.

Operations 
Unlike Boko Haram, which is largely based in Borno State in northeastern Nigeria, Ansaru operated in and around Kano State in north-central Nigeria, the heartland of the Hausa-Fulani peoples. It coordinated its activities with the northern Mali-based al-Qaeda in the Islamic Maghreb and the Movement for Oneness and Jihad in West Africa, and was suspected of having sent some of its fighters to Mali, where they fought in the Northern Mali conflict. Ansaru was probably driven from Mali in course of Operation Serval.

Throughout its insurgent activity in Nigeria, Ansaru closely cooperated with Boko Haram despite being its rival. This was mostly out of necessity, as the two factions could not risk weakening themselves by fighting each other.

Attacks that Ansaru has claimed responsibility for include a prison break at the Special Anti-Robbery Squad headquarters in Abuja in November 2012, a January 2013 attack on a convoy of Nigerian troops on their way to participate in the Northern Mali conflict and a 23 May 2013 attack on a French-owned uranium mine in Niger in cooperation with Mokhtar Belmokhtar.

The group also carried out a number of kidnappings in Nigeria, including the May 2011 abductions of a Briton and an Italian from Kebbi State, the December 2012 kidnapping of a French engineer, Francis Collomp, in Katsina State and the February 2013 kidnapping of seven foreigners (four Lebanese, a Briton, an Italian and a Greek) from a construction site in Bauchi State. Collomp escaped in November 2013. Ansaru executed the hostages taken in both May 2011 and February 2013 following what it said were failed rescue attempts by the British and Nigerian governments.

Decline 
Several of Ansaru's commanders were reported as returning to Boko Haram over 2013. Ansaru held a meeting in 2015, discussing whether it wanted to join ISIL like Boko Haram had done. It decided to remain independent, whereupon several of its members defected to Boko Haram. Following this event, Ansaru became largely dormant and ceased its attacks in Nigeria. Khalid al-Barnawi, the leader of Ansaru, was arrested by Nigerian security forces in Lokoja in April 2016.

Although its operations had largely ceased by this point, Ansaru continued to have an online presence by late 2017, suggesting that several members of the group remained in hiding, possibly waiting for an opportunity to revive the group. Then, in what is its first claimed operation since 2013, Ansaru announced via Al-Qaeda's Al Hijrah Media that it was behind the 14 January 2020 attack on a convoy of the Emir of Potiskum which was travelling on Kaduna-Zaria road in which 30 people, including six Nigerian Army soldiers, were killed.

Designation as terrorist organization 
Ansaru is designated as a proscribed terrorist organization by Iraq, United States, New Zealand and the United Kingdom.

See also

 Boko Haram
 Boko Haram insurgency

References

Bibliography

Further reading
 

Al-Qaeda in the Islamic Maghreb
Groups affiliated with al-Qaeda
Rebel groups in Nigeria
Islamist groups
Islamic terrorism in Nigeria
Jihadist groups
Organizations based in Africa designated as terrorist
Organisations designated as terrorist by the United Kingdom
Organizations designated as terrorist by Iraq
Organizations designated as terrorist by the United States